Bushrangers were originally escaped convicts in the early years of the British settlement of Australia who used the bush as a refuge to hide from the authorities. By the 1820s, the term had evolved to refer to those who took up "robbery under arms" as a way of life, using the bush as their base.

Bushranging thrived during the gold rush years of the 1850s and 1860s when the likes of Ben Hall, Bluecap, and Captain Thunderbolt roamed the country districts of New South Wales. These "Wild Colonial Boys", mostly Australian-born sons of convicts, were roughly analogous to British "highwaymen" and outlaws of the American Old West, and their crimes typically included robbing small-town banks and coach services. In certain cases, such as that of Dan Morgan, the Clarke brothers, and Australia's best-known bushranger, Ned Kelly, numerous policemen were murdered. The number of bushrangers declined due to better policing and improvements in rail transport and communication technology, such as telegraphy. Although bushrangers appeared sporadically into the early 20th century, most historians regard Kelly's capture and execution in 1880 as effectively representing the end of the bushranging era.

Bushranging exerted a powerful influence in Australia, lasting for over a century and predominating in the eastern colonies. Its origins in a convict system bred a unique kind of desperado, most frequently with an Irish political background. Native-born bushrangers also expressed nascent Australian nationalist views and are recognised as "the first distinctively Australian characters to gain general recognition." As such, a number of bushrangers became folk heroes and symbols of rebellion against the authorities, admired for their bravery, rough chivalry and colourful personalities. However, in stark contrast to romantic portrayals in the arts and popular culture, bushrangers tended to lead lives that were "nasty, brutish and short", with some earning notoriety for their cruelty and bloodthirst. Australian attitudes toward bushrangers remain complex and ambivalent.

Etymology
The earliest documented use of the term appears in a February 1805 issue of The Sydney Gazette, which reports that a cart had been stopped between Sydney and Hawkesbury by three men "whose appearance sanctioned the suspicion of their being bush-rangers". John Bigge described bushranging in 1821 as "absconding in the woods and living upon plunder and the robbery of orchards." Charles Darwin likewise recorded in 1835 that a bushranger was "an open villain who subsists by highway robbery, and will sooner be killed than taken alive".

History
Over 2,000 bushrangers are estimated to have roamed the Australian countryside, beginning with the convict bolters and drawing to a close after Ned Kelly's last stand at Glenrowan.

Convict era (1780s–1840s)

Bushranging began soon after British settlement with the establishment of New South Wales as a penal colony in 1788. The majority of early bushrangers were convicts who had escaped prison, or from the properties of landowners to whom they had been assigned as servants. These bushrangers, also known as "bolters", preferred the hazards of wild, unexplored bushland surrounding Sydney to the deprivation and brutality of convict life. The first notable bushranger, African convict John Caesar, robbed settlers for food, and had a brief, tempestuous alliance with Aboriginal resistance fighters during Pemulwuy's War. While other bushrangers would go on to fight alongside Indigenous Australians in frontier conflicts with the colonial authorities, the Government tried to bring an end to any such collaboration by rewarding Aborigines for returning convicts to custody. Aboriginal trackers would play a significant role in the hunt for bushrangers.

Colonel Godfrey Mundy described convict bushrangers as "desperate, hopeless, fearless; rendered so, perhaps, by the tyranny of a gaoler, of an overseer, or of a master to whom he has been assigned." Edward Smith Hall, editor of early Sydney newspaper The Monitor, agreed that the convict system was a breeding-ground for bushrangers due to its savagery, with starvation and acts of torture being rampant. "Liberty or Death!" was the cry of convict bushrangers, and in large numbers they roamed beyond Sydney, some hoping to reach China, which was commonly believed to be connected by an overland route. Some bolters seized boats and set sail for foreign lands, but most were hunted down and brought back to Australia. Others attempted to inspire an overhaul of the convict system, or simply sought revenge on their captors. This latter desire found expression in the convict ballad "Jim Jones at Botany Bay", in which Jones, the narrator, plans to join bushranger Jack Donahue and "gun the floggers down".

Donahue was the most notorious of the early New South Wales bushrangers, terrorising settlements outside Sydney from 1827 until he was fatally shot by a trooper in 1830. That same year, west of the Blue Mountains, convict Ralph Entwistle sparked a bushranging insurgency known as the Bathurst Rebellion. He and his gang raided farms, liberating assigned convicts by force in the process, and within a month, his personal army numbered 80 men. Following gun battles with vigilante posses, mounted policemen and soldiers of the 39th and 57th Regiment of Foot, he and nine of his men were captured and executed.

Convict bushrangers were particularly prevalent in the penal colony of Van Diemen's Land (now the state of Tasmania), established in 1803. The island's most powerful bushranger, the self-styled "Lieutenant Governor of the Woods", Michael Howe, led a gang of up to one hundred members "in what amounted to a civil war" with the colonial government. His control over large swathes of the island prompted elite squatters from Hobart and Launceston to collude with him, and for six months in 1815, Lieutenant-Governor Thomas Davey, fearing a convict uprising, declared martial law in an effort to suppress Howe's influence. Most of the gang had either been captured or killed by 1818, the year Howe was clubbed to death. Vandemonian bushranging peaked in the 1820s with hundreds of bolters at large, among the most notorious being Matthew Brady's gang, cannibal serial killers Alexander Pearce and Thomas Jeffrey, and tracker-turned-resistance leader Musquito. Jackey Jackey (alias of William Westwood) was sent from New South Wales to Van Diemen's Land in 1842 after attempting to escape Cockatoo Island. In 1843, he escaped Port Arthur, and took up bushranging in Tasmania's mountains, but was recaptured and sent to Norfolk Island, where, as leader of the 1846 Cooking Pot Uprising, he murdered three constables, and was hanged along with sixteen of his men.

The era of convict bushrangers gradually faded with the decline in penal transportations to Australia in the 1840s. It had ceased by the 1850s to all colonies except Western Australia, which accepted convicts between 1850 and 1868. The best-known convict bushranger of the colony was the prolific escapee Moondyne Joe.

Gold rush era (1850s–1860s)

The bushrangers' heyday was the Gold Rush years of the 1850s and 1860s as the discovery of gold gave bushrangers access to great wealth that was portable and easily converted to cash. Their task was assisted by the isolated location of the goldfields and a police force decimated by troopers abandoning their duties to join the gold rush.

George Melville was hanged in front of a large crowd for robbing the McIvor gold escort near Castlemaine in 1853.

Bushranging numbers flourished in New South Wales with the rise of the colonial-born sons of poor, often ex-convict squatters who were drawn to a more glamorous life than mining or farming.

Much of the activity in this era was in the Lachlan Valley, around Forbes, Yass and Cowra.

The Gardiner–Hall gang, led by Frank Gardiner and Ben Hall and counting John Dunn, John Gilbert and Fred Lowry among its members, was responsible for some of the most daring robberies of the 1860s, including the 1862 Escort Rock robbery, Australia's largest ever gold heist. The gang also engaged in many shootouts with the police, resulting in deaths on both sides. Other bushrangers active in New South Wales during this period, such as Dan Morgan, and the Clarke brothers and their associates, murdered multiple policemen.

As bushranging continued to escalate in the 1860s, the Parliament of New South Wales passed a bill, the Felons Apprehension Act 1865, that effectively allowed anyone to shoot outlawed bushrangers on sight. By the time that the Clarke brothers were captured and hanged in 1867, organised gang bushranging in New South Wales had effectively ceased.

Captain Thunderbolt (alias of Frederick Ward) robbed inns and mail-coaches across northern New South Wales for six and a half years, one of the longest careers of any bushranger. He sometimes operated alone; at other times, he led gangs, and was accompanied by his Aboriginal 'wife', Mary Ann Bugg, who is credited with helping extend his career.

Decline and the Kelly gang (1870s–1880s)

The increasing push of settlement, increased police efficiency, improvements in rail transport and communications technology, such as telegraphy, made it more difficult for bushrangers to evade capture. In 1870, Captain Thunderbolt was fatally shot by a policeman, and with his death, the New South Wales bushranging epidemic that began in the early 1860s came to an end.

The scholarly, but eccentric Captain Moonlite (alias of Andrew George Scott) worked as an Anglican lay reader before turning to bushranging. Imprisoned in Ballarat for an armed bank robbery on the Victorian goldfields, he escaped, but was soon recaptured and received a ten-year sentence in HM Prison Pentridge. Within a year of his release in 1879, he and his gang held up the town of Wantabadgery in the Riverina. Two of the gang (including Moonlite's "soulmate" and alleged lover, James Nesbitt) and one trooper were killed when the police attacked. Scott was found guilty of murder and hanged along with one of his accomplices on 20 January 1880.

Among the last bushrangers was the Kelly gang in Victoria, led by Ned Kelly, Australia's most famous bushranger. After murdering three policemen in a shootout in 1878, the gang was outlawed, and after raiding towns and robbing banks into 1879, earned the distinction of having the largest reward ever placed on the heads of bushrangers. In 1880, after failing to derail and ambush a police train, the gang, clad in bulletproof armour they had devised, engaged in a shootout with the police. Ned Kelly, the only gang member to survive, was hanged at the Melbourne Gaol in November 1880.

Isolated outbreaks (1890s–1900s)
In July 1900, the Governor brothers—a trio group consisting of an Aboriginal fencing contractor named Jimmy Governor and his associates, Joe Governor and Jack Underwood—perpetrated the Breelong Massacre, wounding one and killing five members of the Mawbey family.

The massacre sparked the Governor brothers to engage in a crime spree across northern New South Wales, triggering one of the largest manhunts in Australian history, with 2,000 armed civilians and police covering 3,000 km of northern New South Wales in a search for the brothers. The Governor brothers were pursued by authorities for a total of three months, consequently being brought down on 27 October with the arrest of Jimmy Governor by a group of armed locals in Bobin, NSW, and the death of his brother, Joe Governor, near Singleton, NSW a few days later.

Jack Underwood (who had been caught shortly after the Breelong Massacre) was hanged in Dubbo Gaol on 14 January 1901, and Jimmy Governor was hanged in Darlinghurst Gaol on 18 January 1901.

"Boy bushrangers" (1910s–1920s)
The final phase of bushranging was sustained by the so-called "boy bushrangers"—youths who sought to commit crimes, mostly armed robberies, modelled on the exploits of their bushranging "heroes". The majority were captured alive without any fatalities.

Public perception

In Australia, bushrangers often attract public sympathy (cf. the concept of social bandits). In Australian history and iconography bushrangers are held in some esteem in some quarters due to the harshness and anti-Catholicism of the colonial authorities whom they embarrassed, and the romanticism of the lawlessness they represented. Some bushrangers, most notably Ned Kelly in his Jerilderie letter, and in his final raid on Glenrowan, explicitly represented themselves as political rebels. Attitudes to Kelly, by far the most well-known bushranger, exemplify the ambivalent views of Australians regarding bushranging.

Legacy
The impact of bushrangers upon the areas in which they roamed is evidenced in the names of many geographical features in Australia, including Brady's Lookout, Moondyne Cave, the township of Codrington, Mount Tennent, Thunderbolts Way and Ward's Mistake. The districts of North East Victoria are unofficially known as Kelly Country.

Some bushrangers made a mark on Australian literature. While running from soldiers in 1818, Michael Howe dropped a knapsack containing a self-made book of kangaroo skin and written in kangaroo blood. In it was a dream diary and plans for a settlement he intended to found in the bush. Sometime bushranger Francis MacNamara, also known as Frank the Poet, wrote some of the best-known poems of the convict era. Several convict bushrangers also wrote autobiographies, including Jackey Jackey, Martin Cash and Owen Suffolk.

Cultural depictions

Jack Donahue was the first bushranger to have inspired bush ballads, including "Bold Jack Donahue" and "The Wild Colonial Boy". Ben Hall and his gang were the subject of several bush ballads, including "Streets of Forbes".

Michael Howe inspired the earliest play set in Tasmania, Michael Howe: The Terror! of Van Diemen's Land, which premiered at The Old Vic in London in 1821. Other early plays about bushrangers include David Burn's The Bushrangers (1829), William Leman Rede's Faith and Falsehood; or, The Fate of the Bushranger (1830), William Thomas Moncrieff's Van Diemen's Land: An Operatic Drama (1831), The Bushrangers; or, Norwood Vale (1834) by Henry Melville, and The Bushrangers; or, The Tregedy of Donohoe (1835) by Charles Harpur.

In the late 19th century, E. W. Hornung and Hume Nisbet created popular bushranger novels within the conventions of the European "noble bandit" tradition. First serialised in The Sydney Mail in 1882–83, Rolf Boldrewood's bushranging novel Robbery Under Arms is considered a classic of Australian colonial literature. It also cited as an important influence on the American writer Owen Wister's 1902 novel The Virginian, widely regarded as the first Western.

Bushrangers were a favoured subject of colonial artists such as S. T. Gill, Frank P. Mahony and William Strutt. Tom Roberts, one of the leading figures of the Heidelberg School (also known as Australian Impressionism), depicted bushrangers in some of his history paintings, including In a corner on the Macintyre (1894) and Bailed Up (1895), both set in Inverell, the area where Captain Thunderbolt was once active.

Film

Although not the first Australian film with a bushranging theme, The Story of the Kelly Gang (1906)—the world's first feature-length narrative film—is regarded as having set the template for the genre. On the back of the film's success, its producers released one of two 1907 film adaptations of Boldrewood's Robbery Under Arms (the other being Charles MacMahon's version). Entering the first "golden age" of Australian cinema (1910–12), director John Gavin released two fictionalised accounts of real-life bushrangers: Moonlite (1910) and Thunderbolt (1910). The genre's popularity with audiences led to a spike of production unprecedented in world cinema. Dan Morgan (1911) is notable for portraying its title character as an insane villain rather than a figure of romance. Ben Hall, Frank Gardiner, Captain Starlight, and numerous other bushrangers also received cinematic treatments at this time.

Alarmed by what they saw as the glorification of outlawry, state governments imposed a ban on bushranger films in 1912, effectively removing "the entire folklore relating to bushrangers ... from the most popular form of cultural expression." It is seen as a major reason for the collapse of a booming Australian film industry. One of the few Australian films to escape the ban before it was lifted in the 1940s is the 1920 adaptation of Robbery Under Arms. Also during this lull appeared American takes on the bushranger genre, including The Bushranger (1928), Stingaree (1934) and Captain Fury (1939).

Ned Kelly (1970) starred Mick Jagger in the title role. Dennis Hopper portrayed Dan Morgan in Mad Dog Morgan (1976). More recent bushranger films include Ned Kelly (2003), starring Heath Ledger, The Proposition (2005), written by Nick Cave, The Outlaw Michael Howe (2013), and The Legend of Ben Hall (2016).

Notable bushrangers

References

External links

Bushrangers trail at Picture Australia
Bushrangers at Australianhistory website
Bushrangers on the National Museum of Australia website

History of Australia (1788–1850)
History of Australia (1851–1900)
Robbers